The Enoch Seminar is an academic group of international specialists in Second Temple Judaism and the origins of Christianity who share information about their work in the field and biennially meet to discuss topics of common interest. The group is supported by the Department of Near Eastern Studies of the University of Michigan and the Michigan Center for Early Christian Studies, the group gathers about 200 university professors from more than fifteen countries.

Overview

The Enoch Seminar focuses on the period of Jewish history, culture and literature from the Babylonian Exile (6th century BC) to the Bar-Kochba revolt (2nd century AD) —the period in which both Christianity and Rabbinic Judaism have their roots. It is a neutral forum where scholars who are specialized in different sub-fields (OT Apocrypha and Pseudepigrapha, Dead Sea Scrolls, Josephus, Philo, New Testament) and are committed to different methodologies, have the opportunity to meet, talk and listen to one another without being bound to adhere to any sort of preliminary agreement or reach any sort of preordained consensus.

Participation at the meetings of the Enoch Seminar is by invitation only and is restricted to University professors and specialists in Second Temple Judaism and Christian Origins who have completed their PhD. Papers circulate in advance among the participants and the entire time at the meetings is devoted to discussion in plenary sessions or small groups. Since 2006, to graduate students, PhD candidates and post-doctorate fellows, the Enoch Seminar has offered a separate biennial conference (the Enoch Graduate Seminar).

Management
The Enoch Seminar was founded in 2000 by Gabriele Boccaccini (University of Michigan), who has chaired it ever since. Boccaccini is professor of Second Temple Judaism and Christian Origins at the University of Michigan and was Editor-in-Chief of the Journal Henoch from 2005 to 2012. Vice-Directors from 2000 to 2011 were the late Hanan Eshel (Bar-Ilan University, Israel) and Loren Stuckenbruck (University of Durham, UK).

The current Board of Directors of the Enoch Seminar includes: Gabriele Boccaccini (chair), Kelley Coblentz Bautch (St. Edwards University, USA), Esther Eshel (Bar-Ilan University, Israel), Matthias Henze (Rice University, USA), Pierluigi Piovanelli (University of Ottawa, Canada), Carlos A. Segovia (Camilo José Cela University, Spain), and Loren T. Stuckenbruck (Ludwig Maximilian University of Munich, Germany).

Veterans and leaders of the Enoch Seminar are Daniel Assefa (Ethiopia), Albert Baumgarten (Israel), Kelley Coblentz Bautch (USA), Andreas Bedenbender (Germany), Gabriele Boccaccini (USA), Daniel Boyarin (USA), James H. Charlesworth (USA), Sabino Chialà (Italy), John J. Collins (USA), Michael Daise (USA), Marcello Del Verme (Italy), Torleif Elgvin (Norway), Yaron Eliav (USA), Esther and Hanan Eshel (Israel), Florentino García Martínez (Belgium), Ida Fröhlich (Hungary), Claudio Gianotto (Italy), Charles A. Gieschen (USA), Lester L. Grabbe (England), Ithamar Gruenwald (Israel), Matthias Henze (USA), Martha Himmelfarb (USA), Michael Knibb (England), Klaus Koch (Germany), Robert A. Kraft (USA), Helge Kvanvig (Norway), Erik Larson (USA), Luca Mazzinghi (Italy), Hindy Najman (Canada), George W.E. Nickelsburg (USA), Andrei Orlov (USA), Pierluigi Piovanelli (Canada), Annette Yoshiko Reed (USA), Jacques van Ruiten (the Netherlands), Paolo Sacchi (Italy), Lawrence Schiffman (USA), Loren Stuckenbruck (Germany), Shemaryahu Talmon (Israel), Eibert Tigchelaar (USA), David Suter (USA), James Vanderkam (USA), Pieter Venter (South Africa), Ralph Williams (USA), Benjamin Wright (USA), and Adela Yarbro Collins (USA). Secretary of the group is J. Harold Ellens (USA).

The Enoch Seminar website, edited by Pierpaolo Bertalotto (PhD University of Bari, Italy), provides not only detailed information about the meetings of the Enoch Seminar (and of the Enoch Graduate Seminar) but also a general picture of the status of studies in Second Temple Judaism and Christian Origins and of the history of research in the field.

Meetings

First Enoch Seminar (Florence 2001): “The Origins of Enochic Judaism”
The First Enoch Seminar was held in Florence, Italy (19–23 June 2001) at the Villa Corsi-Salviati of the University of Michigan at Sesto Fiorentino.

The conference was organized by Gabriele Boccaccini (University of Michigan, USA) in consultation with the other founding members of the Enoch Seminar. It explored the role of the early Enoch literature in the time prior to the Maccabean revolt and probed the hypothesis of the existence of “Enochic Judaism” as a distinctive form of Judaism in the early Second Temple period.

In attendance were 35 scholars, from 8 countries. 
Canada (Mark A. Elliott, Pierluigi Piovanelli)
Germany (Andreas Bedenbender, Klaus Koch)
Italy (Alessandro Catastini, Sabino Chialà, Claudio Gianotto, Luca Mazzinghi, Mauro Perani, Liliana Rosso Ubigli, [Paolo Sacchi])
Israel (Devorah Dimant, Esther Eshel, Hanan Eshel, Ithamar Gruenwald, Sylvia Honigman)
the Netherlands (Florentino Garcia Martinez, Eibert J.C. Tigchelaar)
Norway (Helge S. Kvanvig)
the United Kingdom (Michael A. Knibb, Loren T. Stuckenbruck)
the United States of America (Gabriele Boccaccini, Randy A. Argall, James H. Charlesworth, John Collins, Michael Daise, Yaron Eliav, Martha Himmelfarb, George W.E. Nickelsburg, Stephen B. Reid, Brian Schmidt, David W. Suter, Ralph Williams, Benjamin G. Wright, Adela Yarbro Collins)

J. Harold Ellens, James Waddell, and Adam Chalom of the University of Michigan served as secretaries of the conference.

The Proceeding were published in 2002 by Zamorani.

Second Enoch Seminar (Venice 2003): “Enoch and Qumran Origins”
The second Enoch Seminar was held in Venice, Italy (1–4 July 2003) at Palazzo Sullam.

The conference was organized by Gabriele Boccaccini (University of Michigan, USA), in consultation with the other senior members of the Enoch Seminar. It focused on the role played by the Enoch literature in shaping the ideology and the practice of the Essene movement and the Qumran community.
 
In attendance were 53 scholars from 10 countries: 
Canada (Mark A. Elliott, Pierluigi Piovanelli, Annette Yoshiko Reed)
France (Emile Puech)
Germany (Matthias Albani, Andreas Bedenbender, Stefan Beyerle, Klaus Koch)
Hungary (Ida Fröhlich)
Israel (Albert I. Baumgarten, Esther Eshel, Hanan Eshel, Ithamar Guenwald, Shemaryahu Talmon)
Italy (Piero Capelli, Sabino Chialà, Marcello Del Verme, Claudio Gianotto, Corrado Martone, Mauro Perani, Liliana Rosso Ubigli, Paolo Sacchi)
the Netherlands (Florentino Garcia Martinez, Eibert J.C. Tigchelaar, Jacques van Ruiten)
Norway (Torleif Elgvin, Helge Kvanvig)
the United Kingdom (Philip R. Davies, James R. Davila, Lester L. Grabbe, Charlotte Hempel, Michael A. Knibb, Timothy H. Lim)
the United States (Jeff Anderson, Gabriele Boccaccini, James H. Charlesworth, John J. Collins, Michael Daise, Yaron Eliav, Matthias Henze, Martha Himmelfarb, Armin Lange, Erik W. Larson, George W.E. Nickelsburg, John C. Reeves, Henry W. Rietz, Lawrence H. Schiffman, David W. Suter, Patrick Tiller, James C. VanderKam, Megan Williams, Ralph Williams, Benjamin Wright)

J. Harold Ellens, James Waddell, Ronald Ruark, Jason von Ehrenkrook, and Aaron Brunell of the University of Michigan served as secretaries of the Conference.

The Proceeding were published in 2005 by Eerdmans. An additional volume on the early Enoch literature was planned and published in 2007 by Brill Publishers.
The second Enoch Seminar at Venice was followed by a conference on Jewish and Christian messianism, Il Messia tra memoria e attesa, jointly organized with the Italian biblical association BIBLIA. The proceedings of the meeting were published in 2005 by Morcelliana.

Third Enoch Seminar (Camaldoli 2005): “Enoch and the Messiah Son of Man: Revisiting the Book of Parables”
The Third Enoch Seminar was held at Camaldoli, Italy (6–10 June 2005) at the Foresteria of the Camaldoli Monastery.

The conference was organized by Gabriele Boccaccini (University of Michigan, USA) in consultation with the other senior members of the Enoch Seminar. It focused on the ideology and date of the Parables of Enoch as a Second Jewish document and on its message about the coming of the heavenly messiah "Son of Man."

In attendance were 43 scholars from 11 countries: 
Canada (Pierluigi Piovanelli, Gerbern Oegema)
France (Daniel Assefa)
Germany (Andreas Bedenbender, Klaus Koch)
Hungary (Ida Fröhlich)
Israel (Jonathan Ben-Dov, Esther Eshel, Hanan Eshel, Michael Stone)
Italy (Luca Arcari, Sabino Chialà, Giovanni Ibba, Luca Mazzinghi, Eric Noffke, [Paolo Sacchi])
the Netherlands (Eibert J.C. Tigchelaar)
Norway (Helge Kvanvig)
South Africa (Pieter M. Venter)
the United Kingdom (Lester L. Grabbe, Michael A. Knibb, Darrell D. Hannah, Loren Stuckenbruck)
the United States (William Adler, Kelley Bautch, Gabriele Boccaccini, Daniel Boyarin, James H. Charlesworth, John J. Collins, Charles A. Gieschen, Matthias Henze, Robert Kraft, Phillip Munoa, Hindy Najman, George W.E. Nickelsburg, Daniel Olson, Andrei A. Orlov, David W. Suter, James C. VanderKam, Leslie Walck, Ralph Williams, Benjamin Wright, Adela Yarbro Collins)

J. Harold Ellens, James Waddell, Ronald Ruark, Jason von Ehrenkrook, Aaron Brunell, and Justin Winger of the University of Michigan served as secretaries of the Conference.

The Proceeding were published in 2007 by Eerdmans.

Fourth Enoch Seminar (Camaldoli-Ravenna 2007): “Enoch and the Mosaic Torah: The Evidence of Jubilees”
The Fourth Enoch Seminar was held at Camaldoli, Italy (8–12 July 2007) at the Foresteria of the Camaldoli Monastery, with a final meeting in Ravenna hosted by the University of Bologna (Ravenna Campus).

The Conference was organized by Gabriele Boccaccini (University of Michigan, USA) in consultation with the other senior members of the Enoch Seminar. It focused on the interaction between Mosaic and Enochic traditions in Second Temple Judaism and on the synthesis between them in the Book of Jubilees.

In attendance were 84 scholars from 17 countries:
Australia (David Jackson, William Loader)
Canada (Pierluigi Piovanelli, Hindy Najman, Dorothy Peters, Stephane Saulnier, James Scott)
Denmark (Anders Klostergaard Petersen)
Ethiopia (Daniel Assefa)
Finland (Jutta Jokiranta)
France (Christophe Batsch, Katell Berthelot, Daniel Stökl Ben-Ezra)
Germany (Andreas Bedenbender, Christoph Berner, Benjamin Wold)
Hungary (Ida Fröhlich, Karoly Dobos)
Israel (Albert Baumgarten, Jonathan Ben-Dov, Esther Chazon, Esther Eshel, Hanan Eshel, Bilhah Nitzan, Stephen Pfann, Claire Pfann, Eyal Regev, Michael Segal, Aharon Shemesh, Shemaryahu Talmon)
Italy (Luca Arcari, Pierpaolo Bertalotto, Gianantonio Borgonovo, Marcello Del Verme, Claudio Gianotto, Giovanni Ibba, Luca Mazzinghi, Eric Noffke, Paolo Sacchi, Cristiana Tretti)
the Netherlands (Jacques van Ruiten)
Norway (Torleif Elgvin, Helge Kvanvig)
Poland (Henryk Drawnel)
South Africa (Pieter M. Venter)
the United Kingdom (Siam Bhayro, Lutz Doering, Crispin Fletcher-Louis, Lester L. Grabbe, Grant Macaskill, Loren Stuckenbruck)
the United States (Betsy Halpern Amaru, Kelley Coblentz Bautch, John Bergsma, Gabriele Boccaccini, Darrell Bock, Daniel Boyarin, James H. Charlesworth, Calum Carmichael, Michael Daise, Gene Davenport, Michael Davis, John Endres, Daniel Falk, Charles A. Gieschen, William Gilders, Maxine Grossman, Matthias Henze, Martha Himmelfarb, Jamal-Dominique Hopkins, Robert Kraft, Erik Larson, George W.E. Nickelsburg, Daniel Olson, Andrei A. Orlov, Annette Yoshiko Reed, Lawrence Schiffman, David W. Suter, James C. VanderKam, Sam Thomas, Ralph Williams, Benjamin Wright, Azzan Yadin)
the Vatican (Joseph Sievers)

J. Harold Ellens, Todd Hanneken (University of Notre Dame), and Isaac Oliver (University of Michigan) served as secretaries of the Conference.

The Proceedings were published in 2009 by Eerdmans and by the Journal Henoch.

Fifth Enoch Seminar (Naples 2009): “Enoch, Adam, Melchisedek: Mediatorial Figures in 2 Enoch and Second Temple Judaism”
The Fifth Enoch Seminar was held in Naples, Italy (14–18 June 2009) at the Istituto Cangiani.

The meeting was organized by Andrei A. Orlov (University of Marquette, USA), in consultation with the Chair of the Enoch Seminar, Gabriele Boccaccini, and the other senior members of the group. It focused on the relationship between the characters of Enoch, Adam, and Melchisedek as mediatorial figures in Second Temple Judaism, with special emphasis on the Second Book of Enoch.

In attendance were 55 scholars from 16 countries:

Australia (Mariamne Dacy)
Bulgaria (Anissava Miltenova)
Canada (Pierluigi Piovanelli)
Ethiopia (Daniel Assefa)
France (Daniel Stökl Ben-Ezra)
Germany (Andreas Bedenbender,  Chrisfried Boettrich, Alexander Toepel)
Hungary (Ida Fröhlich)
Israel (Albert Baumgarten, Devorah Dimant, Rachel Elior, Esther Eshel, Hanan Eshel, Alexander Kulik, Rivka Nir, Stephen Pfann, Michael Stone)
Italy (Luca Arcari, Claudio Gianotto, Lara Guglielmo, Luca Mazzinghi)
Netherlands (Joost L. Hagen, Johannes Tromp)
Poland (Henryk Drawnel)
Russia (Basil Lourie)
Spain (Liudmilla Navtanovich, Carlos Segovia)
Switzerland (Gabriella Gelardini)
the United Kingdom (Florentina Badanalova Geller,  James Davila, Lutz Doering, Crispin Fletcher-Louis, Lester L. Grabbe, Emmanouela Grypeou, Grant Macaskill)
the United States (Harold Attridge, Kelley Coblentz Bautch, Gabriele Boccaccini, Darrell Bock, Daniel Boyarin, Silviu Bunta, Calum Carmichael, James H. Charlesworth, J. Harold Ellens, Steven Fraade, Charles A. Gieschen, Matthias Henze, John R. Levison, Jared Ludlow, Eric Mason, Andrei A. Orlov, Lawrence Schiffman, David W. Suter)

Anne Kreps, Isaac Oliver, James Waddell, and Jason Zurawski (University of Michigan) served as secretaries of the Conference.

The Proceedings were published in 2012 by Brill and by the Journal Henoch.

Sixth Enoch Seminar in memory of Hanan Eshel (Milan 2011): “2 Baruch, 4 Ezra: Late First-Century Apocalypticism”

The Sixth Enoch Seminar was held in Gazzada, near Milan, Italy (26 June - 1 July 2011) at Villa Cagnola.

The meeting was organized by Matthias Henze (Rice University, Houston, TX, USA), in consultation with the Chair of the Enoch Seminar, Gabriele Boccaccini, and the other senior members of the group. It focused on 1st-century Jewish Apocalypticism, with particular reference to 2 Baruch and 4 Ezra. A session was held at the Ambrosiana Library where the only extant manuscript of 2 Baruch is preserved.

In attendance were 76 scholars from 17 countries:

Argentina (Laura Bizzarro)
Australia (Marianne Dacy, David Jackson, William Loader)
Canada (Lorenzo DiTommaso, Pierluigi Piovanelli, Hindy Najman, Adele Reinhartz, Benjamin E. Reynolds)
Denmark (Anders Klostergaard Petersen)
England (Lutz Doering, Lester L. Grabbe)
Ethiopia (Daniel Assefa)
Germany (Andreas Bedenbender, Christfried Böttrich, Joost Hagen, Martin Rösel)
Hungary (Balázs Tamási)
Israel (Esther Chazon, Devorah Dimant, Paul Mandel, Rivka Nir, Bilhah Nitzan)
Italy (Gianantonio Borgonovo, Marcello Del Verme, Luca Mazzinghi, Laura Carmen Paladino)
Netherlands (Jacques van Ruiten; Johannes Tromp)
Norway (Helge Kvanvig, Liv Ingeborg Lied)
Poland (Henryk Drawnel)
Russia (Basil Lourié)
Scotland (James R. Davila)
Switzerland (Veronika Bachmann, Gabriella Gelardini) 
United States (Jeff S. Anderson, Kelley Coblentz Bautch, Giovanni Bazzana, Gabriele Boccaccini, Daniel Boyarin, Silviu Bunta, James H. Charlesworth, Calum Carmichael, Rendall D. Chesnutt, John J. Collins, Adela Yarbro Collins, Kindalee Pfremmer De Long, J. Harold Ellens, Daniel Falk, Frances Flannery, Steven D. Fraade, Sandra Gambetti, Daniel Gurtner, Todd Hanneken, Matthias Henze, Karina M. Hogan, Robert Kraft, John R. Levison, Jared W. Ludlow, Eric F. Mason, Carol A. Newsom, George W.E. Nickelsburg, Eugen Pentiuc, Michael Satlow, Lawrence Schiffman, Loren T. Stuckenbruck, David W. Suter, Mark Whitters, Megan Williams, Archie T. Wright, Benjamin Wright, Azzan Yadin, Ziony Zevit)

Jason Zurawski, Isaac Oliver, Deborah Forger, and Rodney Caruthers (University of Michigan) served as secretaries of the Conference.
The Proceedings of the Conference was published in 2014 by Brill. An additional volume containing the short papers presented at the conference was published by T&T Clark.

Seventh Enoch Seminar (Camaldoli 2013): “Enochic Influences on the Synoptic Gospels”

The Seventh Enoch Seminar was held at Camaldoli, Italy (21-26 July 2013) at the Foresteria of the Monastery of Camaldoli.

The meeting was organized by Loren Stuckenbruck (University of Munich, Germany), in consultation with the Chair of the Enoch Seminar, Gabriele Boccaccini, and the other senior members of the group. It focused on the influences of Enochic literature and traditions on the Synoptic Gospels, including and beyond the issue of the Son of Man.

In attendance were 49 scholars from 14 countries:

Brazil (Vicente Dobroruka)
Canada (Lorenzo DiTommaso, André Gagné, Gerbern S. Oegema, Benjamin E. Reynolds)
Denmark (Anders Klostergaard Petersen)
England (Lutz Doering, Lester L. Grabbe)
Ethiopia (Daniel Assefa)
Germany (Florentina Badalanova Geller, Michael Becker, Andreas Bedenbender, Amanda Bledsoe, Oliver Dyma, Matthias Hoffmann, Timothy B. Sailors, Loren Stuckenbruck)
Israel (Albert I. Baumgarten, Vered Hillel, Paul Mandel, Rivka Nir)
Italy (Giovanni Ibba, Luca Mazzinghi, Eric Noffke)
Netherlands (Joost Hagen)
Norway (Årstein Justnes)
Poland (Henryk Drawnel)
Scotland (James R. Davila)
Switzerland (Gabriella Gelardini) 
United States (Joseph L. Angel, Leslie Baynes, Gabriele Boccaccini, Daniel Boyarin, Rodney Caruthers, James H. Charlesworth, Randall D. Chesnutt, Kelley Coblentz Bautch, Michael Davis, Kindalee De Long, J. Harold Ellens, Steven D. Fraade, Daniel M. Gurtner, Robert G. Hall, Matthias Henze, Robert A. Kraft, Isaac W. Oliver, Andrei A. Orlov, Chad Pierce, Amy E. Richter, Archie T. Wright)

Jason Zurawski served as secretary of the Conference.

Eighth Enoch Seminar (Milan 2015): “Apocalypticism and Mysticism”

The Eighth Enoch Seminar was held at Gazzada, near Milan, Italy (21-26 July 2015) at Villa Cagnola.

The meeting was organized by Daniel Boyarin (University of California Berkeley) and Lorenzo DiTommaso (Concordia University Montreal), in consultation with the Chair of the Enoch Seminar, Gabriele Boccaccini, and the other senior members of the group. It focused on the relationship between Second Temple apocalypticism and early Jewish and Christian mysticism.

Jason Zurawski served as secretary of the Conference.

Ninth Enoch Seminar (Camaldoli 2017): “From tôrāh to Torah: Variegated Notions of Torah from the First Temple Period to Late Antiquity”

The Ninth Enoch Seminar was held at Camaldoli, Italy (18–23 June 2017) at the Foresteria of the Camaldoli Monastery.

The meeting was organized by William M. Schniedewind (University of California at Los Angeles) and Jason M. Zurawski (University of Groningen), in collaboration with the Director of the Enoch Seminar, Gabriele Boccaccini. It focused on the diverse understandings of tôrāh, beginning with the Jewish Bible and up through the Second Temple period and into Late Antiquity.

Jason Zurawski served as secretary of the Conference.

The Enoch Graduate Seminar

In 2006 a series of biennial seminars specifically designated for international PhD candidates in the field of Second Temple Judaism and Christian Origins was launched by the Enoch Seminar. The Institutions that hosted the event include:

 2006 - University of Michigan
 2008 - Princeton Theological Seminary & Princeton University
 2010 - Pázmány Péter Catholic University of Budapest, Hungary
 2012 - University of Notre Dame
 2014 - Concordia University Montreal & McGill University
 2016 - University of Texas at Austin
 2018 - Université de Lausanne

The Nangeroni Meetings

In 2012 the Enoch Seminar launched a new series of small-size international seminars, in collaboration with the Alessandro Nangeroni International Endowment and the Michigan Center for Early Christian Studies.

 1 (2012 Milan, Italy): "The Seleucid and Hasmonean Periods and the Apocalyptic Worldview" 
 2 (2014 Dor, Israel). "Voice of Jacob: Early Jewish Texts and Traditions in Christian Transmission"
 3 (2014 Rome, Italy): "Re-Reading Paul as a Second-Temple Jewish Author"
 4 (2015 Milan, Italy): "Early Islam and Its Connections to Judaism and Christianity"
 5 (2015 Naples, Italy): "Second Temple Jewish Paideia in its Ancient Near Eastern and Hellenistic Contexts"
 6 (2016 Camaldoli, Italy): "John the Jew: Reading the Gospel of John’s Christology as a form of Jewish Messianism"
 7 (2016 Rome, Italy): "The Early Reception of Paul the Second Temple Jew"
 8 (2017 Florence, Italy): "New Perspectives and Contexts in the Study of Islamic Origins"
 9 (2018 Milan, Italy): "The Period of the Middle Maccabees: From the Death of Judas through the Reign of John Hyrcanus (ca. 160-104 BCE)"
 10 (2018 Rome, Italy): "Gender & Second Temple Judaism"

References

External links
 Enoch Seminar website
 Michigan Center for Early Christian Studies website
 Review of Biblical Literature website
 4 Enoch: The Online Encyclopedia of Second Temple Judaism

1st-century Christianity
Organizations established in 2000
Christianity and Judaism
Learned societies of the United States
Second Temple period
Biblical studies organizations